WVRU-FM (89.9 MHz) is a non-commercial public radio station in Radford, Virginia.  It is owned and operated by Radford University.  The station plays jazz music, adult album alternative and world music.  It airs National Public Radio (NPR) and Public Radio Exchange (PRX) news and talk shows afternoons and weekends, and runs the BBC World Service overnight.

History
Its original call sign was WRRC.  

On June, 1, 1981, the station changed its call letters to the current WVRU-FM.

Programming
WVRU-FM is a full-service public radio station, airing nationally and locally produced music and public affairs programming.  It is a network affiliate of National Public Radio (NPR), American Public Media (APM) and the Public Radio Exchange (PRX). 

WVRU-FM airs NPR programs World Cafe, Alt.Latino, Mountain Stage, Conversations From the World Cafe and All Songs Considered.  From PRX, it carries Afropop Worldwide, Studio 360 and PRI's The World. The station also airs some independently created public affairs and music programs.

References

External links
 Public Radio WVRU Online
 

VRU-FM
Radio stations established in 1978
Radford University
NPR member stations
Public radio stations in the United States